Geophis betaniensis, the Betanien earth snake, is a snake of the colubrid family. It is endemic to Colombia.

References

Geophis
Snakes of South America
Reptiles described in 1987